Christopher Lee Brooks (born 1972) is a former Democratic member of the Nevada Senate who represented District 3 in Clark County. He previously served in the Nevada Assembly from 2016 to 2018. He represented the 10th district, which covers parts of the central Las Vegas Valley.

Biography
Brooks was born in 1972 in Las Vegas. He has worked for a variety of electrical and energy companies, and currently serves as Managing Principal of Brooks Consulting, a position he has held since 2016.

Brooks ran for the Assembly in 2016 for the seat held by Republican Shelly M. Shelton. He defeated German Castellanos in the Democratic primary and Shelton in the general election.

Brooks was appointed to the Nevada Senate in 2018 to represent the 3rd district. He resigned from the Senate in 2022 to take a private-sector position.

Personal life
Brooks has three children: Arielle, Alan, and Calvin, and two grandchildren; he is married to Michelle White.

Political positions
Brooks supports a $15 minimum wage. He received a 100% rating from Nevada Advocates for Planned Parenthood Affiliates and a 0% rating from the National Rifle Association.

Electoral history

References

External links
 
 Campaign website
 Legislative website

1972 births
Living people
American consultants
Democratic Party members of the Nevada Assembly
Democratic Party Nevada state senators
Politicians from Las Vegas
21st-century American politicians